Daisy Daze is the second EP released by Spencer Tracy.

Track listing 
All tracks written by Lee Jones unless otherwise noted.

 "Daisy Daze" 
 "Stupid"
 "Up in Arms" 
 "Opportunity"
 "Baby Won't You Come"

Personnel

Spencer Tracy
 Lee Jones - Guitars, Vocals & Piano
 John Rabjones - Guitars & Vocals
 Kim Jones - Bass Guitar
 Shaun Sibbes - Drums & Vocals

References

2001 EPs
Spencer Tracy (band) EPs